James River Wildlife Management Area is a  Wildlife Management Area (WMA) in Nelson County, Virginia, near the town of Wingina.

About  of property are open land that was once used for pasture and the growth of crops, although the older fields now support stands of Virginia pine.  The remainder of the land is forested with a mix of pine, oak, and hickory. Various techniques are used to enhance the upland habitat, including prescribed burning and the management of annual and perennial plantings.  of impounded marsh have also been developed to provide food for waterfowl.

James River WMA is owned and maintained by the Virginia Department of Game and Inland Fisheries. The area is open to the public for hunting and trapping, with game opportunities including deer, rabbit, wild turkey, waterfowl, dove, and quail. Fishing, hiking, horseback riding, boating, and primitive camping are also permitted. Access for persons 17 years of age or older requires a valid hunting or fishing permit, a current Virginia boat registration, or a WMA access permit.

See also
 List of Virginia Wildlife Management Areas

References

External links
Virginia Department of Game and Inland Fisheries: James River Wildlife Management Area

Wildlife management areas of Virginia
Protected areas of Nelson County, Virginia